Robert A. Hastey (1847 – September 8, 1930) was mayor of Ottawa in 1906. 
He was born in Bytown in 1847. He worked in the stagecoach business for a number of years. Hastey served on city council as an alderman for twelve years and served as mayor for about a month after mayor James A. Ellis resigned to take a job with the city.

He died in Ottawa in 1930 and was buried in the Beechwood Cemetery.

Hastey Street in the Sandy Hill area of the city was named after him.

References 

Chain of Office: Biographical Sketches of the Early Mayors of Ottawa (1847-1948), Dave Mullington

1847 births
1930 deaths
Mayors of Ottawa
Ottawa controllers